Khanui River is a river flowing down through the valleys of the Khangai Mountains in central Mongolia. It starts in the Chuluut sum of Arkhangai aimag at the north slopes of the Khan-Öndör mountain.
It passes next to the center of Erdenemandal sum, and ends in the Khutag-Öndör sum of Bulgan aimag where it discharges into the Selenge.

References 

Rivers of Mongolia